Honeoye  may refer to:

 Honeoye, New York, a hamlet in Ontario County, New York, at the north end of Honeoye Lake
 Honeoye Creek, a tributary of the Genesee River in western New York
 Honeoye Falls, New York, a village in Monroe County on Honeoye Creek
 Honeoye Lake, the source of Honeoye Creek